George Bond may refer to:

George Bond (pirate) (fl. 1683–1684), English pirate in the Caribbean
George Bond (footballer) (1910–1982), English professional footballer
George Allan Bond, founder of Bonds (clothing) in Australia
George John Bond (1850–1933), Canadian Methodist minister and missionary
George Phillips Bond (1825–1865), American astronomer
George H. Bond (1873–1954), head coach of the Syracuse college football program, 1894
George Hawkesworth Bond (died 1891), British MP for East Dorset, 1886–1891
George F. Bond (1915–1983), US Navy doctor and "father of saturation diving"
George W. Bond (1891–1974), president of Louisiana Tech University, 1928–1936
George Harwell Bond (1891–1952), American architect
George Bond (mayor) (1534–1592), Lord Mayor of London